Horsewhip or horse whip may refer to:

 Crop (implement) or riding crop
 Whip
 Quirt
 Riding aids#Whip
 Horsewhip, common name for the snake species Oxybelis aeneus